Jawahar Singh Aulakh (1814 – 21 September 1845), also anglicised as Jawaheer Singh or Jawahir Singh, was Wazir of the Sikh Empire from 14 May 1845 until his assassination by the Sikh Khalsa Army on 21 September of the same year, under his nephew Maharaja Duleep Singh. He was the elder brother of Jind Kaur, Duleep's mother.

Biography
Jawahar was the son of Manna Singh Aulakh, and the brother of the future Maharani Jind Kaur, whose son Maharajah Duleep Singh he was appointed guardian and tutor of. He was eventually superseded as Duleep's tutor by Lal Singh, who was appointed by Wazir Hira Singh. Hira Singh later had Jawahar imprisoned on suspicion of making treasonous overtures to the East India Company, and during his imprisonment he was beaten and tortured by a Brahmin named Jodha Ram. Upon Hira Singh's fall from power, Jawahar, Lal Singh, and Gulab Singh all put themselves forwards for the position of Wazir; the Maharani selected her brother as Wazir on 14 May 1845. He held the position only briefly, during a tumultuous nine months in which he persecuted those who had antagonised him in the past, including Jodha Ram, who was mutilated. A heavy drinker, Jawahar distrusted and was distrusted by the Sikh Khalsa Army, and relied more upon the troops of Alexander Gardner.

His most significant action was his alleged ordering of the murder of the rebel Prince Pashaura Singh, which was carried out after Pashaura had been offered safe conduct and surrendered. The Khalsa believed that Jawahar had personally ordered the death, fearing that the prince presented too great a threat to young Duleep Singh. The leaders of the Khalsa demanded he present himself before them on 21 September 1845, which he did after much prevarication and attempts at bribery.

Jawahar met with the Khalsa on the appointed date, with an escort of elephants and people including the Maharani, and the Maharaja himself seated beside him, in an attempt to ensure his own safety. The soldiers, however, removed the escort and dragged away the Maharani, causing Jawahar to panic: Duleep was pulled out of his arms and taken to the Maharani, and the Wazir was bayoneted, dragged from his elephant, and speared to death, supposedly being stabbed fifty times.

Gallery

References

People of the Sikh Empire
Assassinated Indian politicians
Sikh Empire
1814 births
1845 deaths